Halurgia is a monotypic moth genus in the subfamily Arctiinae. Its single species is Halurgia aurorina. Both the genus and species were first described by Gottlieb August Wilhelm Herrich-Schäffer in 1855.

References

Lithosiini